Lawrence James Christopher VanDyke (born 1972) is an American attorney and jurist serving as a United States circuit judge of the United States Court of Appeals for the Ninth Circuit. He is a former solicitor general of Nevada and Montana.

Early life and education 

VanDyke was born in Midland, Texas, and grew up in Bozeman, Montana. After attending Oklahoma Christian University from 1992 to 1995, VanDyke studied civil engineering at Montana State University, graduating in 1997 with a Bachelor of Science with highest honors. He worked for his family's construction company and did graduate study at Montana State for the next three years, receiving a Master of Construction Engineering Management degree in 2000.

From 2000 to 2002, VanDyke attended Bear Valley Bible Institute, a Bible college in Denver, Colorado, from which he received a Bachelor of Theology degree summa cum laude. He then attended Harvard Law School, where he was an editor of the Harvard Law Review and the Harvard Journal of Law and Public Policy. He graduated in 2005 with a Juris Doctor magna cum laude.

Legal career 
VanDyke was in private practice at the law firm Gibson Dunn from 2005 to 2006, then served as a law clerk to judge Janice Rogers Brown of the U.S. Court of Appeals for the District of Columbia Circuit from 2006 to 2007. He returned to Gibson Dunn from 2007 to 2012. While in private practice, VanDyke performed pro bono legal work for groups including the American Civil Liberties Union, the Free Market Foundation, and the Alliance Defending Freedom. In 2010, VanDyke filed an amicus brief in Christian Legal Society v. Martinez on behalf of Gays and Lesbians for Individual Liberty in which he argued that a college student group had a First Amendment right to exclude from membership students whose sexual conduct violated the group's stated beliefs.

From 2012 to 2013, VanDyke was an assistant to the Solicitor General of Texas. He was then appointed the Solicitor General of Montana but resigned in 2014, citing strain in the workplace. As Solicitor General of Montana, he submitted numerous amicus curiae briefs filed in other states. He recommended signing on to other states' challenges to state and federal gun laws, co-wrote a brief supporting an Arizona law prohibiting abortions after 20 weeks, and recommended that Montana file a brief in a New Mexico case involving a photographer who refused to photograph a lesbian commitment ceremony.

VanDyke later ran unsuccessfully for the Montana Supreme Court. He became Solicitor General of Nevada under Attorney General Adam Laxalt in 2015, where he served until 2019 when he became a deputy Assistant Attorney General for the United States Department of Justice Environment and Natural Resources Division.

Since graduating law school, VanDyke has been a member of the Federalist Society.

Federal judicial service 

On September 20, 2019, President Donald Trump announced his intent to nominate VanDyke to serve as a United States Circuit Judge of the United States Court of Appeals for the Ninth Circuit. Nevada Senators Jacky Rosen and Catherine Cortez Masto, both Democrats, announced their opposition in the nomination. The nomination was to the seat being vacated by Judge Jay Bybee, who previously announced his intention to assume senior status on December 31, 2019. Six retired justices of the Montana Supreme Court publicly opposed VanDyke's nomination. VanDyke received a "not qualified" rating from the American Bar Association. An ABA evaluator conducted 60 anonymous interviews with lawyers, judges, and others who had worked with VanDyke. In unusually personal terms, the ABA published a scathing critique of VanDyke in a letter to the Senate Judiciary Committee; that letter asserted that some interviewees described VanDyke as "'arrogant, lazy, an ideologue, and lacking in knowledge of the day-to-day practice'" of law. The ABA added that "'There was a theme that the nominee lacks humility, has an 'entitlement' temperament, does not have an open mind, and does not always have a commitment to being candid and truthful'". The ABA also raised "concerns about whether Mr. VanDyke would be fair to persons who are gay, lesbian, or otherwise part of the LGBTQ community, claiming that "Mr. VanDyke would not say affirmatively that he would be fair to any litigant before him, notably members of the LGBTQ community."

On October 30, 2019, a hearing on VanDyke's nomination was held before the Senate Judiciary Committee and it became contentious. Most of the two-hour hearing was focused on VanDyke's record on LGBTQ issues. During his confirmation hearing, VanDyke was asked by Senator Josh Hawley (R-MO), "Did you say that you wouldn't be fair to members of the LGBTQ community?" VanDyke broke down in tears, denying the accusation: "'I did not say that. I do not believe that. It is a fundamental belief of mine that all people are created in the image of God and they should all be treated with dignity and respect'". Senator Patrick Leahy (D-VT), questioned VanDyke about an opinion editorial he wrote in 2004 while a student at Harvard Law noting that same-sex marriage may be harmful for children on average. VanDyke stated generally that some of his personal views have changed since that time. VanDyke said that his ABA evaluator told him that she was in a "hurry" and did not give him the opportunity to fully respond to concerns. The ABA acknowledged that the lead ABA evaluator assigned to VanDyke, Montana attorney Marcia Davenport, had contributed $150 to VanDyke's opponent in a 2014 Montana Supreme Court election.

The ABA's treatment of VanDyke was widely denounced by conservative commentators. Writing for National Review, John McCormack asked: "Were VanDyke's comments to the ABA twisted or taken wildly out of context in order to paint him as a bigot? It is hard to believe any judicial nominee would suggest during an interview with the ABA that he might not be 'fair' to all litigants." McCormack asked the ABA for a transcript of the relevant portion of its interview with VanDyke, but the ABA declined to provide one. Legal scholar Adam White, a former member of the ABA's Administrative Law Section, wrote a Wall Street Journal op-ed arguing that there was "no basis on which to evaluate any of the broad-brush descriptions of Mr. VanDyke. We don't know what basis, if any, his critics have for these judgments, or even who they are. We're expected to take the ABA's disparagement at face value". The Wall Street Journal editorial board also published a critique of the ABA's treatment of VanDyke. Writing in The Atlantic, law professor Josh Blackman suggested that "[g]oing forward, when a nominee is rated as unqualified, the transcript should be released, and the recording should be posted publicly online."

On November 21, 2019, VanDyke's nomination was reported out of committee by a 12–10 vote. On December 10, 2019, the United States Senate invoked cloture on his nomination by a 53–40 vote. On December 11, 2019, his nomination was confirmed by a 51–44 vote. He received his judicial commission on January 2, 2020. 

In November 2021, VanDyke blasted the Ninth Circuit's "embarrassing" immigration rulings. He believes that the Ninth Circuit frequently "play[s] [the Board of Immigration Appeals]-for-a-day instead of genuinely deferring to the agency’s decisions."

Notable opinions 
Reports have noted VanDyke's strident dissents in a number of cases.

Duncan v. Bonta

One of these dissents was in Duncan v. Bonta, a challenge to a California law that limits gun magazine capacity to 10 bullets. The en banc panel upheld the law, and VanDyke accused the majority of "distrust[ing] gun owners and think[ing] the Second Amendment is a vestigial organ of their living constitution" and having an "undefeated, 50–0 record against the
Second Amendment." VanDyke concluded his dissent by saying that the ruling means that "at most, you might get to possess one janky handgun and 2.2 rounds of ammunition, and only in your home under lock and key."  In a concurring opinion to the majority ruling, Judge Andrew Hurwitz singled out VanDyke's dissent and rebuked his colleague "for attacking the personal motives of his sisters and brothers on this Court."  Hurwitz pointed out that individual members of the majority panel owned handguns in their homes for self-defense and had served in the military where they bore arms.  Hurwitz called for a higher level of respect, indicating that all federal judges swear an oath to uphold the constitution and are duty-bound to interpret the right to bear arms in the context of the public's desire to protect itself from indiscriminate mass shootings, saying: "The people of  California should not be precluded from attempting to prevent mass murders simply because they don’t occur regularly enough in the eyes of an unelected Article III judge."  In response, VanDyke wrote, "Respectfully, Judge Hurwitz’s claim that our judges’ personal views about the Second Amendment and guns have not affected our jurisprudence is simply not plausible."

McDougall v. County of Ventura 
VanDyke wrote a majority opinion holding that two California counties violated the Second Amendment when they shut down gun and ammunition stores in 2020 as nonessential businesses during the COVID-19 pandemic.  In an unusual move, VanDyke wrote a concurrence to his own opinion, predicting that the case will be heard en banc and claiming that “no firearm-related ban or regulation ever ultimately fails” in the Ninth Circuit.  He criticized his court's approach to Second Amendment challenges as “exceptionally malleable.” He then attached a 13-page concurrence, writing a ruling in favor of the California counties—the opposite conclusion of his own opinion for the panel—and explaining: "I figure there is no reason why I shouldn’t write an alternative draft opinion that will apply our test in a way more to the liking of the majority of our court. That way I can demonstrate just how easy it is to reach any desired conclusion under our current framework, and the majority of our court can get a jumpstart on calling this case en banc. Sort of a win-win for everyone." He ended the alternate opinion with “You’re welcome.”

2022 beauty pageant case
VanDyke held in a court case that beauty pageant companies may exclude trans women as part of their freedom of speech rights. In this case, he wrote, "It is commonly understood that beauty pageants are generally designed to express the ‘ideal vision of American womanhood."

See also 
 Donald Trump judicial appointment controversies

References

External links 
 
 

1972 births
Living people
21st-century American lawyers
21st-century American judges
Federalist Society members
Harvard Law School alumni
Judges of the United States Court of Appeals for the Ninth Circuit
Montana lawyers
Montana State University alumni
Nevada lawyers
People associated with Gibson Dunn
People from Midland, Texas
Solicitors General of Montana
Solicitors General of Nevada
Texas lawyers
United States court of appeals judges appointed by Donald Trump
United States Department of Justice lawyers